Peter Dwyer was an American football, basketball, and baseball coach and college athletics administrator. He served as the head football coach and head basketball coach at Niagara University from 1923 to 1927. After working as an assistant coach at Syracuse University, Dwyer became the head football coach and head basketball coach at Clarkson University in Potsdam, New York. He was a 1910 graduate of the University of Notre Dame, where he played left halfback on the school's football team.

Dwyer was the Niagara head coach during the notorious 1923 Niagara vs. Colgate football game in which his player refused to tackle Colgate players unless they agreed to play a shortened game with 8-minute quarters.

Head coaching record

Football

References

Year of birth missing
Year of death missing
American football halfbacks
Clarkson Golden Knights football coaches
Clarkson Golden Knights men's basketball coaches
Davidson Wildcats football coaches
Niagara Purple Eagles athletic directors
Niagara Purple Eagles baseball coaches
Niagara Purple Eagles football coaches
Niagara Purple Eagles men's basketball coaches
Notre Dame Fighting Irish football players
Syracuse Orange football coaches